Poland Together (PR or PRZP), formally Poland Together United Right (Polska Razem Zjednoczona Prawica), was a conservative-liberal political party in Poland. The party was founded on 7 December 2013 by former Minister of Justice and Civic Platform member Jarosław Gowin and members of centre-right political parties Poland Comes First and Conservative People's Party.

Between 2013 and 2014, it had four members of the European Parliament: Adam Bielan, independent politician, initially from Law and Justice party, Paweł Kowal and Marek Migalski, who both joined from Poland Comes First, and Artur Zasada, who joined from Civic Platform.  They sat in the European Conservatives and Reformists (ECR) parliamentary group.

In the 2015 presidential election, PR supported the victorious Law and Justice candidate for President of Poland, Andrzej Duda. Politics of Poland Together join the election lists under Law and Justice in 2015 Polish parliamentary election and gained 8 seats in Sejm and 6 in Senat. After elections some local politics were elected to parliament, 4 regional leaders of party got a seats in regional councils (sejmiks) and in total the party has 12 of them. President of the Poland Together Jarosław Gowin became deputy prime minister, and minister of Science and Higher Education, Piotr Dardziński became deputy minister of Gowin's ministry, Jadwiga Emilewicz became deputy minister of Development, Marek Zagórski became deputy minister of National Treasure, Adam Bielan was elected as the Deputy Speaker of the Senate.

In October 2017, Gowin announced that at its next congress, PR would dissolve into a new party including elements from the Republican Association, libertarian activists and local government. Shortly after this announcement, independent MP Magdalena Błeńska and Senator Józef Zając joined the party. At the congress on 4 November, PR officially dissolved and joined the new Agreement party.

Election results

Sejm

References

External links

2013 establishments in Poland
Catholic political parties
Conservative liberal parties
Defunct conservative parties
Defunct liberal political parties
Defunct political parties in Poland
Eurosceptic parties in Poland
Liberal conservative parties in Poland
Political parties disestablished in 2017
Political parties established in 2013